The white-chinned thrush, known in Jamaica as the hopping Dick (Turdus aurantius) is a species of bird in the family Turdidae. It is found in Jamaica. Its natural habitats are subtropical or tropical moist lowland forests, subtropical or tropical moist montane forests, and heavily degraded former forest.

Gallery

References

Birds described in 1789
Taxa named by Johann Friedrich Gmelin
Birds of Jamaica
Turdus
Taxonomy articles created by Polbot